Andrew Pyper (born March 29, 1968) is a Canadian author.

Early life: childhood and education
Pyper's parents emigrated from Northern Ireland to Stratford, Ontario. His father was an ophthalmologist, his mother trained as a nurse. Pyper was the youngest of five children. As a child, he read a lot of books and aspired to be a writer. "I was a de facto only child, because there were eight years between me and the next brother. Like a lot of only children, I turned to the nerdier pursuits of books and writing and ... making things up." He studied at McGill University in Montreal, Canada, and obtained an honours B.A. and M.A. in English Literature. Rather than pursue a doctorate, Pyper followed a girlfriend to Toronto and studied law at the University of Toronto (U. of T.). Although that relationship ended, Pyper continued three years of legal studies and graduated with a law degree (LL.B) and earned a Legal Theory Award. After articling for a year he was called to the bar in 1996. He has never practised law. "I knew very early on that I wasn't going to be a lawyer, but I was brought up to believe, wrongly I think, that once you start something you never quit — real Presbyterian stick-to-it-iveness."

While he was at the U. of T. he had several short stories published in Canadian literary magazines including Quarry and The New Quarterly. "It was a classic writerly compromise, I thought I'll get a job and hopefully make enough moneyworking part-time to feed the writing. What I didn't anticipate was how much I'd hate the law." Before he had finished his articling year Pyper decided to pursue a career as a fiction writer.

Career
Pyper had set himself the goal of having a book published before he turned thirty. Unbeknownst to Pyper, his editor at Quarry, Steven Heighton, sent a number of his short stories to John Metcalf, an editor at the Canadian publisher The Porcupine's Quill. To Pyper's delight, Metcalf published them in a volume entitled Kiss Me, released in October 1996.
 
Pyper then obtained a writer-in-residence position at Trent University's Champlain College. While there he wrote his first novel, Lost Girls. It was published in Canada by HarperCollins in 1999 and became a Canadian bestseller. It was published by Delacourt in the U.S. and MacMillan in the U.K. in 2000. It was in the Top 10 on the Times paperback list and in the Top 30 of The New York Times paperback bestseller list. It was also translated and published in Italian, German, Dutch and Japanese. The novel is being developed for a TV series, with Pyper attached as creator and Executive Producer. The book received widespread critical acclaim. The New York Times called it "brilliant" and The Boston Globe called it "compulsively readable."

The Trade Mission was Pyper's second novel. It was published in 2002 in Canada by HarperFlamingo, in the U.K. by Macmillan Publishers, and a year later in the U.S. by Scribner. It was also published in translation in Germany and the Netherlands. The Times (London) called it "suspenseful" and The Globe and Mails reviewer called it "breathtaking... a thriller with a serious centre."

His third novel, titled The Wildfire Season, was published in 2005 by HarperCollins in both Canada and the U.K. and by Thomas Dunne Books/St. Martin's Press in the U.S. a year later. It was also translated into Dutch and published in The Netherlands in 2005. This novel was also widely praised. The Barnes & Noble Review called it: "a profoundly moving work of literature that succeeds on numerous levels", and The London Evening Standard described it as "outstanding."

The Killing Circle, Pyper's fourth novel, was published in 2008 by Doubleday in Canada, HarperCollins Publishers in the U.K., and Thomas Dunne Books in the U.S. It was also translated and published internationally in the Netherlands, Germany, France, Italy, Spain,
Portugal, Japan and the Czech Republic. Publishers Weekly called the novel "an extraordinary thriller", and Booklist said of Pyper: "Few are better at conveying an omnipresent sense of dread and horror bubbling just beneath life's seemingly mundane routines."

Pyper's fifth novel was titled The Guardians and was published in 2011 by Doubleday Canada, and Orion in the UK. It was translated and published in both Italy and the Netherlands. The Guardian called it: "a compelling and genuinely creepy read", and it was chosen A Best Book of the Year in the Dutch national newspaper NRC Handlesblad.

The Demonologist, Pyper's sixth novel, was published in Canada and the U.S. in March 2013 by Simon and Schuster, and in the U.K. by Orion. The novel was also translated and published in Greece, Holland, Bulgaria, China, Poland, Turkey, Taiwan, Spain, Russia, Italy, Brazil, Japan, Slovakia, the Czech Republic and France. Now magazine called Pyper "a star because he writes so spectacularly." The novel's film rights are held by Oscar-winning director and producer Robert Zemeckis and his company ImageMovers and Universal Pictures.

Pyper's seventh novel, The Damned, was released by Simon and Schuster in North America in February 2015, and by Orion in the U.K. Translation rights have been sold to publishers in Russia and Italy. Kirkus Reviews called the novel: " A treat for fans of intelligent treatments of the supernatural and rock-solid writing."

While writing his major novels Pyper continued to write short stories.

Pyper has taught creative writing courses at the University of Toronto and Colorado College, Colorado Springs, USA.

His newest novel, The Homecoming, is slated for publication in 2019.

Awards and accolades

Kiss Me: Chosen as Notable Book of the Year by The Globe and Mail and The New York Times.  
 The Demonologist: Chosen as Publishers Weeklys Top Ten Mysteries & Thrillers of Spring 2013; An Indie Next Pick for March 2013 by the American Booksellers Association; Book-of-the-Month Club Selection; Amazon Top Ten Best of the Month Pick; one of Amazon.ca's Best Books of 2013; a Globe and Mail Best Book of 2013; Nominated for the 2014 Libris Award for Author of the Year (Canada); Shortlisted for the 2014 Libris Award for Fiction Book of the Year; Winner of the ITW (International Thriller Writers) 2014 Thriller Award for Best Hardcover Novel; Nominated for the 2013 Shirley Jackson Award for Best Novel (USA); and Shortlisted for the Sunburst Award (Canada)
 The Damned: selected as one of the Best Suspensful Thriller Books of the years by DuJour
 Pyper has been awarded The Grant Allen Award for his contributions to Canadian crime and mystery literature.

Published works

Short stories
All of these stories were published as eBooks. 
 "Sausage Stew" – Published 2012 by HarperCollins
 "Dime Bag Girl" – Published 2012 by HarperCollins
 "Call Roxanne" – Published 2012 by HarperCollins
 "If you Lived Here You'd Be Home By Now" - Published 2012 by HarperCollins
 "House of Mirrors" – Published 2012 by HarperCollins
 "The Earliest Memory Exercise" – Published 2012 by HarperCollins
 "Camp Sacred Heart" – Published 2012 by HarperCollins 
 "Breaking and Entering" – Published 2012 by HarperCollins
 "The Author Shows a Little Kindness" – Published 2012 by HarperCollins
 "Magnificent" – Published 2012 by HarperCollins
 "1001 Names and Their Meanings" – Published 2012 by HarperCollins
 "X-ray" – Published 2012 by HarperCollins

Personal life
Pyper is married to Heidi Rittenhouse, has two children, and lives in Toronto.

References

External links
Official site
Canadian publisher's site
Initial reviews for The Guardians

1968 births
Living people
Canadian male novelists
Lawyers in Ontario
University of Toronto alumni
McGill University alumni
People from Stratford, Ontario
Writers from Toronto
20th-century Canadian novelists
21st-century Canadian novelists
20th-century Canadian short story writers
21st-century Canadian short story writers
Canadian male short story writers